Kunzea affinis is a flowering plant in the myrtle family, Myrtaceae and is endemic to the south-west of Western Australia. It is a shrub with many branches, small, crowded leaves and pink, five-petalled flowers in early spring.

Description
It usually has a few erect branched which have many intricate, short side branches and which are hairy when young. The leaves are erect or pressed against the stem and have long hairs, mainly along their margins.

The flowers are arranged in groups of two to five flowers on the ends of the branches which continue to grow after flowering. Flowering occurs from August to October and is followed by fruit which are small capsules which release many small seeds when ripe.

Taxonomy and naming
Kunzea affinis was first formally described in 1920 by Spencer Moore and the description was published in Journal of the Adelaide Botanic Garden. The specific epithet (affinis) is a Latin word meaning "related to". (Moore noted the similarity of this species to Kunzea pauciflora.)

Distribution and habitat
This kunzea grows in sandy soils in a range of habitats including kwongan, in scrubby vegetation and along rivers, mainly between Ravensthorpe, the Stirling Range, Cape Riche and Lake King in the Coolgardie, Esperance Plains and Mallee biogeographic regions.

Conservation
Kunzea affinis is classified as "not threatened" by the Western Australian Government Department of Parks and Wildlife.

Use in horticulture
This kunzea has been in cultivation for many years. It can be most easily propagated from cuttings collected in spring or early summer or from seed but the seed is difficult to collect. This kunzea does best in areas where rainfall is mostly in winter and in well-drained soils. It will tolerate some shade and at least moderate frost and can be kept in shaped by light tip pruning.

References

affinis
Endemic flora of Western Australia
Myrtales of Australia
Rosids of Western Australia
Plants described in 1920